Starlight Dancer is a 1977 album by Dutch progressive rock band Kayak. It was produced by Jack Lancaster and Kayak.

The North American release is very different from the original Dutch/European release with the same title. In fact it is a compilation of songs from Starlight Dancer and their previous album The Last Encore (1976). The American record company, Janus Records, used the title Starlight Dancer but the sleeve design of The Last Encore.

European version 
This album is the only Kayak album with members Charles Louis Schouten (drums) and Theo de Jong (bass).

The song "Golddust" is the only song written by Max Werner that Kayak recorded. It features a guest appearance by Dutch keyboardist Rick van der Linden.

Only two songs of this release ("Turn the Tide" and "Starlight Dancer") were used on the North American release. "Want You to Be Mine" and "Irene" are also included, but these were in fact demo-versions, slightly different from the versions on the European album.

Until July 2010, the European version of Starlight Dancer was not released on CD in its own right. It was released as part of a double CD set called Three Originals. This double CD exists of the complete albums Starlight Dancer, Phantom of the Night and Periscope Life, plus five non-album bonus tracks. In July 2010, Universal/Mercury released the European album on a single CD.

Track listing

North American version 
The song "Ballad For a Lost Friend" is included on the album Kayak - The Golden Years of Dutch Music, released by Universal Music in 2015. In the Netherlands, the song was used as a single B-side. The North American album was not released on CD.

Track listing

Personnel 
 Max Werner - lead vocals, Mellotron, percussion
 Johan Slager - electric and acoustic guitars, backing vocals
 Ton Scherpenzeel - piano, backing vocals, clavinet, organ, string ensemble, Mellotron, accordion, synthesizers, double bass
 Theo de Jong - bass guitar (EU 1-11, US 1-3, 6, 11)
 Charles Louis Schouten - drums (EU 1-11, US 1-3, 6, 11)
 Bert Veldkamp - bass guitar (US 4, 5, 7-10) [uncredited]
 Pim Koopman - drums  (US 4, 5, 7-10) [uncredited]

References

1977 albums
Kayak (band) albums